Irwin McDowell "Tiny" Turner (April 6, 1895 – October 19, 1965) was an American football player. He played college football at Ohio State University in 1916. He then played one game of professional football at center for the Canton Bulldogs in 1919. In 1920, with  the formation of the American Professional Football Association, Turner played two games at guard for the Dayton Triangles.

References

1895 births
1965 deaths
American football guards
Ohio State Buckeyes football players
Dayton Triangles players
Players of American football from Columbus, Ohio